The term Tanno may refer to:

Places
Tanno, Hokkaidō, town in Tokoro District, Japan
Tanno Station, railway station in above town

People
Tanno is also a Japanese surname which may refer to:

Akira Tanno (1925–2015), Japanese photographer
Asami Tanno (born 1985), Japanese track athlete
Kenta Tanno (born 1986), Japanese football player
Shinobu Tanno (born 1973), Japanese illustrator

Religion
Joyous Life, in which one of Tenrikyo's spiritual practices is tannō (joyous acceptance)